We Too Are One is the seventh studio album by British pop duo Eurythmics, released on 11 September 1989 by RCA Records. It would be the duo's last studio release until 1999's Peace.

Background and release
When it was released in 1989, the album debuted at number one in the United Kingdom, where it has since been certified double platinum. It spawned four singles, all of which reached the UK top 30: "Revival", "Don't Ask Me Why", "The King and Queen of America", and "Angel". In North America, "(My My) Baby's Gonna Cry" was also released as a single; it charted at number 58 in Canada, while failing to chart in the United States.

On 14 November 2005, Sony BMG repackaged and released Eurythmics' back catalogue as Deluxe Edition reissues, including We Too Are One. The original track listing was supplemented with bonus tracks and remixes.

Home media
A companion home video, We Two Are One Too, was released in 1990, featuring the music videos for the five singles from the album and footage of the band performing the album's other tracks. This is the only commercial release of the promotional video for the 1989 single "Revival", which has never been included on any subsequent video compilations from the band.

Track listing

Personnel
Credits adapted from the liner notes of We Too Are One.

Eurythmics
 Annie Lennox – vocals
 David A. Stewart – guitars, vocals

Additional musicians
 Pat Seymour – keyboards
 Olle Romo – drums
 Charlie Wilson – backing vocals
 Chucho Merchán – programming

Technical
 David A. Stewart – production
 Jimmy Iovine – production
 Bruce Lampcov – recording engineering, mixing engineering
 Don Smith – recording engineering, mixing engineering
 Manu Guiot – additional engineering
 Rob Jaczko, Serge Pauchard, Lee Manning – engineering assistance
 Tony Quinn, Eileen Gregory, Greg McCarty – production assistance

Artwork
 Jean-Baptiste Mondino – photography
 Laurence Stevens – design, artwork

Charts

Weekly charts

Year-end charts

Certifications

References

1989 albums
Albums produced by David A. Stewart
Albums produced by Jimmy Iovine
Eurythmics albums
RCA Records albums